Xinghua is a town under the administration of Meihekou City in southwestern Jilin province, China, located about  northeast of downtown just off of G1212 Shenyang–Jilin Expressway. , it has eight villages under its administration.

See also 
 List of township-level divisions of Jilin

References 

Township-level divisions of Jilin